Boyd Jay Petersen (born February 23, 1962) is program coordinator for Mormon Studies at Utah Valley University (UVU) and teaches English and literature at UVU and Brigham Young University (BYU).  He has also been a biographer of Hugh Nibley, a candidate for the Utah House of Representatives, and president of the Association for Mormon Letters.  He was named editor of Dialogue: A Journal of Mormon Thought for the term 2016-2020.

Biography
Petersen was born in Provo, Utah, and raised as a member of the Church of Jesus Christ of Latter-day Saints (LDS Church).  From 1980-1981, he was a proselyting missionary in Paris, France.

After his mission, Petersen attended Brigham Young University (BYU), receiving his bachelor's degree in French and international relations in 1988.  In 1995, he received an M.A. in comparative literature from the University of Maryland at College Park.  In 2007, he completed his Ph.D. in comparative literature from the University of Utah's Department of Languages and Literature.

Petersen has been an intern for the U.S. House of Representatives, in the staff of the U.S. Senate Committee on Energy and Natural Resources, and a Senior Information Specialist for the Congressional Research Service at the Library of Congress.

In 1984, Petersen married Zina Nibley, a daughter of Hugh Nibley.  They have four children and reside in Provo, Utah. In 2017, they were divorced.

Petersen has been a lecturer in the honors program at BYU, and for the English and Humanities Departments at Utah Valley University, where he received a Faculty Excellence Award in 2006.  Through his familial relationship to Hugh Nibley, Petersen authored the 2002 biography Hugh Nibley: A Consecrated Life.  Petersen has also published articles in several journals, including BYU Studies, Sunstone, Dialogue: A Journal of Mormon Thought, and the Journal of Mormon History.

Petersen is the program coordinator for Mormon Studies at Utah Valley University.  He has also been on the board of directors for the Association for Mormon Letters (AML), Mormon Scholars in the Humanities, and Segullah, a Mormon-themed literary journal. He served as AML's president from 2009-2010.  He is book review editor for the Journal of Mormon History, and was named editor for Dialogue: A Journal of Mormon Thought for the 2016-2020 term.

Political campaigns
In March 2008, Petersen announced his candidacy for District 64 of the Utah State House of Representatives, running as a socially conservative Democrat in a heavily conservative region.  He opposed Republican Rebecca Lockhart on a platform of ethics and health care reform, as well as improved public education.  On the November 4 election, Petersen received 30 percent of the vote, losing to Lockhart's 66 percent.

In 2012, Petersen ran again against Lockhart, who had since become the Speaker of the House.  On November 6, Petersen lost with 24 percent to Lockhart's 76 percent.

Published works

Books

Articles

Other

"Eternity in an Hour" in Baring Witness edited by Holly Welker (University of Illinois Press, 2021)

Notes

External links 
 Petersen's blog
 Faculty page at UVU
 Faculty page at BYU
 VoteForBoyd.com, website for Petersen's campaigns
 Petersen's 2008 campaign blog

1962 births
20th-century Mormon missionaries
21st-century American biographers
American essayists
American Latter Day Saint writers
American Mormon missionaries in France
Candidates in the 2008 United States elections
Brigham Young University alumni
Brigham Young University faculty
Literary scholars
Living people
American male biographers
American male essayists
Mormon studies scholars
Writers from Provo, Utah
Religious biographers
University of Maryland, College Park alumni
University of Utah alumni
Utah Democrats
Utah Valley University faculty
Latter Day Saints from Utah
Candidates in the 2012 United States elections